Archernis mitis is a moth in the family Crambidae. It was described by Turner in 1937. It is found in Taiwan and Australia, where it has been recorded Queensland and New South Wales.

The wingspan is about 20 mm. The forewings are pale brown, with a faint darker zig-zag lines across the wings.

The larvae feed on Populus deltoides. They live communally in a nest made of leaves joined together with silk. Full-grown larvae reach a length of about 20 mm. Pupation takes place in a silken web between the leaves of the host plant.

References

Moths described in 1937
Spilomelinae
Moths of Taiwan
Moths of Australia